Blastodacna libanotica is a moth in the family Elachistidae. It is found in Anatolia and the Near East.

The wingspan is 14–15 mm. The forewings have a white costal streak and a white-outlined triangular mark beyond the middle.

The larvae mainly feed on Pyrus species, but have also been recorded on Crataegus species. They create galls in young shoots of their host plant. Several galls can be found on a single twig. Larvae can be found in the second half of summer. Larvae can be found from summer to the beginning of fall. Pupation takes place in the gall at the end of fall.

References

Moths described in 1939
Blastodacna